Five Years (1969–1973) is a box set by English singer-songwriter David Bowie, released in September 2015. The period of Bowie's career from 1969 to 1973 is summarised over twelve discs and thirteen LPs. Exclusive to the box sets is Re:Call 1, a new compilation of non-album singles, single versions and B-sides. The collection is the first in a series of box sets covering Bowie's entire career.
 
It includes the albums David Bowie (more commonly known as Space Oddity), The Man Who Sold the World, Hunky Dory, The Rise and Fall of Ziggy Stardust and the Spiders from Mars, Aladdin Sane and the last Spiders album with Bowie Pin Ups. The albums cover the five years of Bowie's rise to stardom, with the box set also including Live Santa Monica '72, the soundtrack album of the last Ziggy Stardust show at the Hammersmith Odeon, and a 2003 Ken Scott stereo remix of Ziggy Stardust (previously available on the 2003 SACD edition and 2012 vinyl-and-DVD-Audio edition of the album).

The box set comes with a companion book featuring rarely seen photos, recording essays from producers Tony Visconti and Ken Scott, original press reviews and a short foreword by Ray Davies of the Kinks.

Track listing
All songs included are written by David Bowie, except where noted.

David Bowie ( Space Oddity, 2015 remaster)

The Man Who Sold the World (2015 remaster)

Hunky Dory (2015 remaster)

The Rise and Fall of Ziggy Stardust and the Spiders from Mars (2012 remaster)

Aladdin Sane (2013 remaster)

Pin Ups (2015 remaster)

Live Santa Monica '72 (2008 remaster)

 In the CD version of the album, all the tracks are contained on one disc.

Ziggy Stardust: The Motion Picture Soundtrack (2003 remaster)

The Rise and Fall of Ziggy Stardust and the Spiders from Mars (2003 Ken Scott mix)

Re:Call 1 (remastered tracks)

Charts

References

David Bowie compilation albums
2015 compilation albums
Parlophone compilation albums